Oass (The Dew Drop) is a 2012 Bollywood film directed by Abhinav Shiv Tiwari with Dibya Chhetri, Priyanka Bose and Yashpal Sharma in the lead roles.

The film deals with the theme of human trafficking, focusing particularly on child prostitution. It is based on the real-life story of the abduction of an 11-year-old Nepalese girl who was sold to a brothel in New Delhi by her aunt.

Plot
Kiku, a young girl in a Nepal village, is sent off by her family with an aunt with a promise of better life. The aunt takes her to Delhi selling her to a madam in a brothel where a series of forced sexual encounters follow. Following a murder there, the owner of another brothel takes her along with a child even younger than herself. She is subjected to beatings and torture as her plans to escape are thwarted.

Cast
Dibya Chhetri as Kiku 
Priyanka Bose as Madam 
Yashpal Sharma as John 
Jameel Khan as Baadu 
Subrat Dutta as Jhukki
Amit Dhawan as Sujeet 
Sonam Stobgias Gorky as Ganesh 
Barnali Medhi as Putul 
Sneha Thapa as Kiran 
Nicolas Cacciavillani as Wilson 
Anny Sharma as Amreen 
Kiran Sharma as Shobha 
Nidhi Mahawan as Pinky
Jatin Sarna as Javed 
Tina Bhatia as Vidya
Shusheela Thapa as Vishakha 
Anamika Tiwari as Rashmi 
Bholu as Bholu

Accolades
Oass was named the best film at the second edition of the Ladakh International Film Festival (LIFF), where it also won the award for best screenplay and Divya Chhetri was named the best actress.

References

External links

Official website

2012 films
2010s Hindi-language films